Lyuba may refer to:

 Lyuba (given name), a Slavic male or female given name cognate to Ljuba or Luba or Lyubov
 Lyuba (mammoth), a female mammoth calf
 Lyuba (crater), a crater on Venus